123rd Infantry Division (123. Infanterie-Division) was a unit of the Wehrmacht during World War II.

History

Commands and operational areas

Composition
 Infanterie-Regiment 415
 Infanterie-Regiment 416
 Infanterie-Regiment 418
 Artillerie-Regiment 123
 Pionier-Bataillon 123
 Feldersatz-Bataillon 123
 Panzerjäger-Abteilung 123
 Aufklärungs-Abteilung 123
 Nachrichten-Abteilung 123
 Divisions-Nachschubführer 123

Personnel

Commanders

Chiefs of Staff

Bibliography
  Werner Haupt: Demjansk – Ein Bollwerk im Osten, Bad Nauheim 1963.
  Werner Haupt: Heeresgruppe Nord, Bad Nauheim 1967.
  Franz Kurowski: Demjansk – Der Kessel im Eis, Wölfersheim-Berstadt 2001.

Military units and formations established in 1939
Infantry divisions of Germany during World War II
1939 establishments in Germany
Military units and formations disestablished in 1945